Cheiroseius is a genus of mites in the family Ascidae.

Species
 Cheiroseius aciculatus (Evans & Hyatt, 1960)      
 Cheiroseius aequalis (Schweizer, 1961)      
 Cheiroseius alpestris Berlese, 1916      
 Cheiroseius antennatus Karg, 1979      
 Cheiroseius appendicis Karg, 1998      
 Cheiroseius areolacus McDaniel & Bolen, 1983      
 Cheiroseius basileus (Schweizer, 1961)      
 Cheiroseius biarcuatus Karg, 1998      
 Cheiroseius borealis (Berlese, 1904)      
 Cheiroseius borii (Ishikawa, 1969)      
 Cheiroseius brevipes Karg, 1977      
 Cheiroseius brevivermis Karg, 1998      
 Cheiroseius cascadensis (de Leon, 1964)      
 Cheiroseius cassiteridum (Evans & Hyatt, 1960)      
 Cheiroseius creber Karg, 1977      
 Cheiroseius curtipes (Halbert, 1923)      
 Cheiroseius cyclanalis Ma, 2000      
 Cheiroseius dentatissimus Karg, 1996      
 Cheiroseius eutarsalis Karg, 1998      
 Cheiroseius feideri Solomon, 1985      
 Cheiroseius ferratus Karg, 1981      
 Cheiroseius flagellatus Karg, 1979      
 Cheiroseius floridianus (de Leon, 1964)      
 Cheiroseius foliatus Karg, 1996      
 Cheiroseius frenatus Karg, 1998      
 Cheiroseius furcatus Karg, 1973      
 Cheiroseius glaber (Berlese, 1886)      
 Cheiroseius granulosus Karg, 1998      
 Cheiroseius greeneae (de Leon, 1964)      
 Cheiroseius guthriei (Ewing, 1913)      
 Cheiroseius handschini (Schweizer, 1949)      
 Cheiroseius inguinalis Karg, 1977      
 Cheiroseius insculptus (Keegan, 1946)      
 Cheiroseius kargi Gwiazdowicz, 2002      
 Cheiroseius koehleri Karg, 1994      
 Cheiroseius laelaptoides (Berlese, 1887)      
 Cheiroseius latocorpus Karg, 1998      
 Cheiroseius latoventris Karg, 1998      
 Cheiroseius levicuspidis Karg, 1998      
 Cheiroseius longipes (Willmann, 1951)      
 Cheiroseius mackerrasae (Womersley, 1956)      
 Cheiroseius mutilus (Berlese, 1916)      
 Cheiroseius nasutus Karg, 1981      
 Cheiroseius neocorniger (Oudemans, 1903)      
 Cheiroseius nepalensis (Evans & Hyatt, 1960)      
 Cheiroseius nodosus (Evans & Hyatt, 1960)      
 Cheiroseius ocularis Karg, 1998      
 Cheiroseius parbatensis (Evans & Hyatt, 1960)      
 Cheiroseius phillipi Jordaan, Loots & Theron, 1987      
 Cheiroseius plumacuspidis Karg, 1998      
 Cheiroseius porulatus Karg, 1996      
 Cheiroseius reptantus Karg, 1998      
 Cheiroseius salicorniae (Willmann, 1949)      
 Cheiroseius saltatorius Karg, 1998      
 Cheiroseius sayanicus Bregetova, 1977      
 Cheiroseius serratus (Halbert, 1915)      
 Cheiroseius severnensis Jordaan, Loots & Theron, 1987      
 Cheiroseius signatus (Evans & Hyatt, 1960)      
 Cheiroseius sinicus Yin & Bei, 1991      
 Cheiroseius siphonophorus Karg, 1998      
 Cheiroseius squamofili Karg, 1994      
 Cheiroseius squamosus Karg, 1977      
 Cheiroseius taoanensis Ma, 1996      
 Cheiroseius tennesseensis (de Leon, 1964)      
 Cheiroseius tetrados Karg, 1998      
 Cheiroseius tosanus (Ishikawa, 1969)      
 Cheiroseius trifurcatus Karg, 1998      
 Cheiroseius trilobus Karg, 1981      
 Cheiroseius trispinosus Karg, 1981      
 Cheiroseius trupchumi (Schweizer, 1961)      
 Cheiroseius tuberculatus (Evans & Hyatt, 1960)      
 Cheiroseius unguiculatus (Berlese, 1887)      
 Cheiroseius viduus C.L. Koch, 1839      
 Cheiroseius wuwenzheni Ma-Liming, 1996

References

Ascidae